The Webster City Post Office is a historic building located in Webster City, Iowa, United States.  Previous post office buildings in the city were housed in leased storefronts along Seneca Street.  The Beaux-Arts style building was designed by the U.S. Treasury with James Knox Taylor as the supervising architect.  Contractor Charles E. Atkinson completed the building in 1909.  The stone building features a stone frieze, cornice, and a mansard roof.  It was listed on the National Register of Historic Places in 1982.

See also 
List of United States post offices

References 

Government buildings completed in 1909
Beaux-Arts architecture in Iowa
Post office buildings on the National Register of Historic Places in Iowa
Buildings and structures in Hamilton County, Iowa
National Register of Historic Places in Hamilton County, Iowa
Buildings with mansard roofs